SM UB-41 was a German Type UB II submarine or U-boat in the German Imperial Navy during World War I.

Design
A German Type UB II submarine, UB-41 had a displacement of  when at the surface and  while submerged. The submarine was powered by two Körting six-cylinder diesel engines producing a total , two Siemens-Schuckert electric motors producing , and one propeller shaft.

UB-41 was fitted with two  torpedo tubes, four torpedoes, and one  Uk L/30 deck gun. She had a complement of twenty-one crew members and two officers and a 42-second dive time.

Construction and career
The U-boat was ordered on 22 July 1915 and launched on 6 May 1916. She was commissioned into the German Imperial Navy on 25 August 1916 as SM UB-41.

The submarine sank eight ships in thirteen patrols. They included the William Cory and Son collier , which UB-41 torpedoed in the North Sea off Robin Hood's Bay on 8 September 1917. UB-41 was  reported missing on 5 October 1917. The same day, a large explosion was observed from the coast at Scarborough, England. The case of her loss was either an internal explosion, or she struck a mine, possibly a German one, and sank in the North Sea on 5 October 1917.

Her wrecksite was discovered in 1989 and surveyed in 1997 and 2003. The vessel is broken into two sections, at degree angles laying on the starboard side, and showing signs of impact damage.

Summary of raiding history

References

Notes

Citations

Bibliography 

 

1916 ships
Ships built in Hamburg
World War I submarines of Germany
German Type UB II submarines
U-boats commissioned in 1916
Maritime incidents in 1917
U-boats sunk in 1917
U-boats sunk by mines
World War I shipwrecks in the North Sea
Ships lost with all hands
Protected Wrecks of the United Kingdom